Selim Ahmed Hoss (also transliterated Salim Al-Hoss; born 20 December 1929) is a veteran Lebanese politician who served as the Prime Minister of Lebanon and a longtime Member of Parliament representing his hometown, Beirut. He is known as a technocrat.

Early life and personal life 
Hoss was born into a Sunni Muslim family in Beirut in 1929. He received his undergraduate degree in economics from the American University of Beirut and a PhD in business and economics from Indiana University in the United States.

Hoss was married to Leila Pharaoun, a Maronite Christian who converted to Islam at the end of her life in order to be buried next to her husband in a Muslim cemetery, according to a 2000 interview with Hoss.

Political career
El-Hoss served as prime minister of Lebanon four times. The first was from 1976 until 1980 during the first years of the Lebanese Civil War. His second, and most controversial term, was from 1987 until 1989, when in 1988 he unconstitutionally nominated himself as prime minister but was recognized by many nations and statesmen of the international community. El-Hoss was chosen a third time to serve as prime minister by President Elias Hrawi from November 1989 until December 1990. He served as prime minister again from December 1998 to October 2000.

After losing his parliamentary seat to a previously unknown candidate running with former Prime Minister Rafik Hariri in the general elections of 2000, a frail Hoss resigned as prime minister, declaring an end to his political career.

In March 2005, he was considered as a candidate to form a new government following the resignation of Omar Karami (Prime Minister again), but he reportedly refused to accept the position for health reasons; Najib Mikati was subsequently appointed.

During his last two terms as prime minister, he was also foreign minister.

He is a member of the anti-imperialist conference Axis for Peace. Hoss is a strong opponent of capital punishment, and during his term as Prime Minister he refused to sign any execution warrants, temporarily halting executions in Lebanon, which remain rare.

Hoss's second term
From January to September 1988, he boycotted meetings of his own cabinet, in protest against the policies of President Amine Gemayel. On 22 September, he refused to accept his dismissal in favour of General Michel Aoun, a Maronite Christian. The crisis was precipitated by the failure of the National Assembly to elect a new president (a post traditionally reserved for a Maronite).

Since the Lebanese constitution states that in the event of a presidential vacancy, the outgoing president appoint a temporary prime minister to act as president, outgoing president Gemayel decided to appoint Maronite army commander Michel Aoun to that office, notwithstanding the tradition of reserving it for a Sunni Muslim. Al-Hoss refused to concede the prime minister's post to Aoun, so the two ended up heading rival administrations; with Aoun occupying the presidential palace at Baabda, Hoss established his own office in Muslim-dominated West Beirut.

Lebanon was thus left with no president and two rival governments: one constitutional and the other recognized by many states. However, although Syria, at the time occupying much of Lebanon, supported Hoss, and although Hoss' cabinet was already operational, most of the international community dealt with administrations on both sides of the Green Line and recognized both as Lebanon's prime ministers even though, constitutionally speaking, Aoun was the lawfully-appointed prime minister and acting president of Lebanon.

Violent conflict between the two prime ministers soon arose over Michel Aoun's refusal to accept the presence of Syrian troops in Lebanon. In competition with Aoun, Hoss remained acting president from 1988 until 5 November 1989, when René Moawad took office. When Moawad was assassinated seventeen days later, Hoss reprised his role as acting president for two days, at which point Elias Hrawi was elected to succeed Moawad.

In 1990, the civil war ended when Aoun was forced to surrender following an attack on the presidential palace by Syrian and Lebanese military forces. Hoss subsequently resigned as prime minister, in favour of Omar Karami.

Retirement 
On 2 May 2017, aged 87, Hoss took part in a one-day hunger strike in a show of solidarity with the ongoing hunger strike of some 1,500 Palestinian prisoners.

Bibliography 
 The Development of Lebanon as Financial Market (in English), 1974.
 Window on the Future (in Arabic), 1981.
 Lebanon: Agony and Peace (in English), 1982.
 Lebanon at the Crossroads (in Arabic), 1983.
 Dots on the Is (in Arabic), 1987.
 A War Among Victims (in Arabic), 1988.
 On the Road to a New Republic (In Arabic), 1991.
 The Epoch of Resolution and Whim (in Arabic), 1991.
 A Time of Hope and Disappointment (in Arabic), 1992.
 Reminiscences and Lessons (in Arabic), 1994.
 For Fact and History (in Arabic), 2001.
 Nationalist Landmarks (in Arabic), 2002.
 Face-to-Face with Sectarianism (in Arabic), 2003.
 Gist of a Life Time (in Arabic), 2004.
 Sound without Echo (in Arabic), 2004
 A call for an Open Dialogue (in Arabic), 2005.
 Stance as weapon (in Arabic), 2006.
 Epoch of Agonies (in Arabic), 2007.
 Ma Qalla wa dall (in Arabic), 2008.

References

1929 births
Living people
Politicians from Beirut
Lebanese Sunni Muslims
Prime Ministers of Lebanon
Foreign ministers of Lebanon
Economy and Trade ministers of Lebanon
Government ministers of Lebanon
Members of the Parliament of Lebanon
American University of Beirut alumni
American University of Beirut trustees